Behshahr (formerly Ashraf and Ashraf ol Belād) is a city in Mazandaran, Iran & the capital of Behshahr County. At the 2006 census, its population was 83,537, in 22,034 families.

History
In 1832 David Brewster wrote in The Edinburgh Encyclopædia that "Ashraff is celebrated as the favourite residence of Shah Abbas, and enjoys the only good harbour on the southern side of the Caspian".

Prior to the arrival of Shah Abbas I Ashraf was a village of no distinction. The location took the fancy of Abbas I who made it an imperial residence in 1613 and he commissioned the construction of a palace and gardens. The heyday of the town was from that time until the middle of the 18th century. At the time that Sir Thomas Herbert visited the palace in 1628 there were about 2,000 families living in the town that at that time contained at least 300 public bath houses. However the town was the scene of both internal disorder and external threats (it was repeatedly sacked by Turkomans), so although it was still a significant town in 1727 when the peace of concluded the Ottoman–Persian War (1722–1727), the town was gradually abandoned. Jonas Hanway visited the town in 1744 when it was in a state of decay, and by 1812 when Sir William Ouseley visited there the palace was in ruins. By 1860 Ashraf was no more than a large village of 845 houses with between eight and ten thousand inhabitants.

Explore
Kamarband cave is notable for three human skeletons discovered there, dating to approximately 9000 years B.C. Other finds included flint blades, walrus and deer bones, giving valuable information about human development from the ice age in the Mazandaran area.

Description
The name Behshahr literally means "fine city". It includes many historical sites such as Abbas Abad the home of Shah Abbas I of Persia, Cheshmeh Emarat Palace, Baghe Shah Gardens and the Chit Sazi weaving factor  Abbas Abbad  which is famous for its greenery and beauty and also its historic significance is a major tourism attraction. There is a road which leads up to a mountain through the jungle. In the touristic Abbas Abbad, the jungle surrounds a lake with a semi-destroyed castle in the middle. The castle once belonged to the Shah Abbas.

Behshahr is home to many famous Iranian figures ranging from actors to political figures. One of the more famous political figures from Behshahr is Ahmad Tavakkoli who once was a presidential candidate. Every year, famous members of the Iranian entertainment industry gather in Behshahr in a ceremony rewarding entertainers. More recently, such members included Parviz Parastui.

The city of Behshahr is an industrial city which produces Tokhme, vegetable oil, and a dish-soap known as Rika. Rika is the local term for son. Behshahr is home to Behshahr Industrial Company which is the biggest producer of vegetable oil in Iran since 1951.
Recently, after scavenging near the suburbs of Behshahr, an ancient town was discovered which included nearly a thousand corpses of children to middle-aged men. The corpses had heights above the modern typical heights. In the area, gold and jars were found.

Abbas Abbad 
Built at the order of Abbas I of Persia in the southeast of Behshahr in the midst of the Jungle, Abbasabad complex marks Iran's most prominent non-desert garden which comprises a lake, a palace, towers as well as showers while a mansion in the middle of the lake has given it outstanding beauty.
The lake covers and areas of more than 10 hectares with an 18-meter-tall mansion at the center which hides underwater for more than half of the year; nevertheless, in the seasons of drought the whole structure, which has stood the test of time, resides out of the water.
Abbas Abbad which is famous for its greenery and beauty and also its historic significance is a major tourism attraction. There is a road which leads up to a mountain through the jungle. In the touristic Abbas Abbad, the jungle surrounds a lake with a semi-destroyed castle in the middle. The castle once belonged to the Shah Abbas. The irrigation mechanisms created during the Safavid dynasty in this region are extremely unusual which greatly contributed to the registration of the site on UNESCO World Heritage List.

Tourism
 Abbas Abad Historical Complex
 Miankaleh peninsula
 International Miankaleh Lagoon
 Historical Sefidchah Cemetery
 Mellat Garden
 Ghohartape
 Huto and Kamarband Caves
 Museum of Behshahr Martyrs
 Cheshmeh Emarat
 Palace Safiabad
 Palangan Castle
 Kusan Fireplace
 Asiab Sar Castle
 Sang No Waterfall
 Siami House
 Mellat Park (Chehel Sotoun Ashraf)
 Sikapol Bridge
 Afghan Nejad Mansion
 Tomb Amir Seyed Kamaluddin

Notable people

 Mulla Muhammad Ashrafi - Marja and Cleric Scholar
 Khayr al-Nisa Begum - Wife Mohammad Khodabanda
 Sardar Rafie Yanehsari - Military
 Ali Yachkaschi - Scholar in environmental science
 Ahmad Tavakkoli - Politician
 Ali Asghar Bazri - Wrestler
 Mousa Nabipour - Basketball player
 Ali Rahnama - Futsal player
 Behnam Ehsanpour - Wrestler
 Mehrdad Tahmasbi - Football player
 Mohammad Ami-Tehrani - Olympic weightlifting
 Anahita Hemmati - Actress
 Syyed Abdul Karim Hashemi Nejad - Dissident cleric

Gallery

Notes

References

External links

Populated places in Behshahr County

Cities in Mazandaran Province